Casterman is a publisher of Franco-Belgian comics, specializing in comic books and children's literature. The company is based in Brussels, Belgium.

History
The company was founded in 1780 by Donat-Joseph Casterman, an editor and bookseller originally from Tournai. Casterman was originally a printing company and publishing house. In 1934, Casterman took over the Le Petit Vingtième editions for the publication of the albums of The Adventures of Tintin, from the fourth album of the series, Cigars of the Pharaoh. From 1942, Casterman published reworked versions and colored versions of the previous Tintin albums.

Strengthened by the success of Hergé's comics, shortly after, Casterman proposed new series with new authors such as Jacques Martin, François Craenhals and C. & V. Hansen. From 1954 on, Casterman published children's books, as well, including the successful Martine books by Marcel Marlier and the Cadet- Rama books written by Alain Gree (units Achille et Bergamote and Petit Tom).

Keen to appeal to a more mature market, Casterman decided in 1973 to publish the first albums of Corto Maltese by the Italian author Hugo Pratt. Furthermore, in 1978, Casterman established its monthly magazine A Suivre, which was to influence the comics revival of the 1980s. Casterman ceased the publication of A Suivre in 1997.

Casterman is now part of Groupe Flammarion.

Casterman's manga series are published under the imprint Sakka.

References

External links
 

Book publishing companies of Belgium
Comic book publishing companies of Belgium
Tintin
Belgian brands
Companies established in 1780
Publishing companies established in the 1780s
Tournai
Companies based in Hainaut (province)